Xerochlamys bojeriana is a plant in the family Sarcolaenaceae. It is endemic to Madagascar.

Description
Xerochlamys bojeriana grows as a shrub. The flowers may be solitary or in inflorescences of two flowers, with pink to white petals.

Distribution and habitat
Xerochlamys bojeriana is native to central Madagascar. Its habitat is woodlands to  elevation. This habitat is threatened by wildfires. The species is present in protected areas including Isalo National Park.

References

bojeriana
Endemic flora of Madagascar
Plants described in 1872
Taxa named by Henri Ernest Baillon